This is a list of computer hardware and software which supports FLAC (Free Lossless Audio Codec), a file format designed for lossless compression of digital audio.

Hardware support

Car devices 

 Alpine CDE-163BT
 Alpine UTE-62BT
 Citroën DS5
 Hyundai Ioniq
 Hyundai Kona
 Kenwood KMM-100U
 Peugeot 208 Blue Lion
 Pioneer Avic-4100 -> 8100NEX
 Pioneer DEH-X8700BH
 Power Acoustik PD-622NB
 Renault Espace
 SEAT León
 Sony MEX-N5100BT
 Sony MEX-XB100BT
 Sony XAV-AX1000
 Tesla Models S/X/3/Y

DJ players 

Pioneer CDJ-2000nexus2
Pioneer CDJ-TOUR1
Pioneer XDJ-1000mk2

Portable stereo / boombox

Active speakers 

 Fenda F&D A140X, F&D A180X
 Logitech Z607 5.1

Home audio AV receivers / amplifiers 

 Bang and Olufsen BeoSound 5
Denon AVR-1612, AVR-2313, AVR-3310, AVR-3808, AVR-4308, AVR-4310, AVR-4311, AVR-4520A, AVR-4810, AVR-5308, AVP-A1HDCI, AVR-X1000, AVR-X2000, AVR-X3000, AVR-X4000, NP-720AE*Escient
Onkyo TX-8050, TX-SR309, TX-SR333, TX-NR535, TX-NR626, TX-NR636, TX-NR737, TX-NR838, TX-NR1030, TX-NR3030 
Pioneer SC-05, SC-07, SC-25, SC-27, SC-35, SC-37, SC-09TX, X-HM76B, XC-HM86
Sonos 16-bit max.
 Sony's High-Res Audio Players
Yamaha RX-A1000/A2000/A3000 AV Receiver, RX-V477, RX-V671, RX-V673 (RX-V773, RX-V671, RX-V673 – up to 96 kHz streaming and 192 kHz external link) AV Receivers, RX-V773, RX-V795, RX-V1067, RX-V2065 AV Receiver, RX-V2067, RX-V3067 AV Receivers

Home media servers and clients 

 Cambridge Audio CXN Network Player | Azur 851N Network Player
 Dvico TVIX HD M-6500, N1 (cafe), HD M-6600A/N Plus, HD M-7000
Linn Klimax DS, Renew DS, Akurate DS, Majik DS and Sneaky Music DS
Logitech Squeezebox and Transporter network music players from Logitech.  Current products decode natively, old v1 units transcode to PCM on the server. (discontinued)
Naim Audio HDX Hard Disk Player, NaimUniti, UnitiQute, DAC, NDX, UnitiServe
Meridian Sooloos
Pixel Magic Systems' HD Mediabox (with firmware 1.3.4 or higher)
PS Audio Perfect Wave DAC + Bridge (Digital-to-Analog Converter/Digital Streamer)
Seagate FreeAgent Theater+ HD, HDTV Network Media Player STAJ100
T+A Music Player
Western Digital WD TV HD based

Portable handheld players 

Colorfly C3, C4, C10, C200
Creative Zen X-Fi 2
 FiiO X Series
iAudio (Cowon): A2, A3, 6, 7, F2, O2, M3, M5, X5, U3, U5, D2, D2+, S9, J3, X7 native support with newer firmware.
iriver E200, E150, E100, E50, E30, Lplayer, SPINN, T8.
Meizu M6 Mini Player, M3 Music Card
PonoPlayer
Rio Karma
Samsung YP-U5 USB stick portable player
 Sandisk Clip Sport
SanDisk Sansa Fuze, Clip (with updated firmware), Clip+, Fuze+, Clip Zip
Teclast T29, T39, C260, C280, C290
Transcend MP860, MP870
 TRAXMOD Open source, open hardware portable MMC/SD player
Trekstor Vibez
VEDIA A10, B6

Smartphones and tablets 

Archos 5 Internet Tablet
Archos Internet Media Tablets
Nokia N900, Nokia N9
 BlackBerry Playbook Tablet, BlackBerry 10 smartphones
Most Android devices with a compatible third-party player, such as Apollo or 
Samsung Droid Charge, Galaxy S II Epic 4G Touch, Exhibit 4G, Fascinate, Infuse 4G, Mesmerize
Samsung Galaxy Note, R, S, S Plus, S II, S II LTE, S III, Samsung Galaxy W, SL, Tab, U and all later models running Android 3.1 or later
LG Optimus G, LG G2, LG G3, LG G4, LG V10, LG G5, LG V20
Sony Xperia Z series, Sony Xperia X, XA, XA1
Samsung Wave series
 Windows Mobile 6.5 or earlier with compatible third-party software player.
 Windows Phone devices running Windows 10 Mobile (Windows Phone 7/8 may vary).
 Jolla series of smartphones

Blu-ray / DVD / USB players 
 LG UBKM9, UBK90, UBK80 (Blu-ray players with USB port)
 OPPO Digital BDP-93 & BDP-95 and BDP-103 & BDP-105 Universal Network 3D Blu-ray Disc Players, and UDP-203 & UDP-205 4K Ultra HD Blu-ray Disc Players
 Panasonic BDP-BD77, BDT500
 Roku Ultra (media player)
 Samsung HT-H4500R
 Sony BDP-S1200, BDP-S3200, BDP-S4200, BDP-S5200

Portable handheld recorders 
 Olympus LS-P4

Unsorted 

 Embedded Waveplayer Module with FLAC level 0–2 support, MIDI and serial interface

Software support

Encoding 
Although some software supports FLAC natively "out of the box", some require installation of a third-part FLAC filter or plug-in.

Decoding 

Cross-platform
Boxee
FFmpeg
aTunes
PS3 Media Server
Adobe Audition
Audacity 1.3.5 Beta
Clementine
Firefox
fre:ac
MPlayer
Songbird
Style Jukebox
Squeezebox
The Core Pocket Media Player with FLAC plugin
VLC media player
Kodi
Mixxx Digital DJ software
Plex media center

Microsoft Windows
Ableton Live
Adobe Premiere Pro with FLAC plugin
AIMP
foobar2000
GoldWave
JRiver Media Center since version 12.0.3xx
iTunes after installing codec from Xiph (Ogg FLAC only)
JetAudio
K-Multimedia Player
Media Go
MediaMonkey
MusicBee
Cockos REAPER Multitrack Recorder and Editor
Renoise supports import and export from version 1.8
Quintessential Player with FLAC plugin
SUPER
Vegas Pro 8, Vegas Pro 9
Total Recorder
TRAKTOR 3
TRAKTOR Scratch
TVersity, using ffdshow to transcode stream to WAV
Winamp
Windows Media Player and Media Player Classic with third-party plugin
Media Player Classic Home Cinema
Yahoo! Music Jukebox
Windows Mobile
Kinoma Play
CorePlayer (Shareware)

Unix-like operating systems
Audacious
Banshee
Baudline
cmus
mpd
ogg123 (if compiled against FLAC: ogg123 is part of the 'vorbis-tools' package)
Xine
XMMS
XMMS2
GNOME
Quod Libet (software)
Rhythmbox
Totem Movie Player
Serpentine
KDE
Amarok
JuK

Mac OS X
Ableton Live
Cog
CorePlayer (Shareware)
QuickTime with the Xiph QT component
TCPMP (version 0.72rc1, open source) with free plug-in
TRAKTOR 3
TRAKTOR Scratch

Android
Poweramp

Ripping 

Cross-platform
Songbird
aTunes
cdda2wav
fre:ac

Microsoft Windows
CDex included in v1.7 beta2
Exact Audio Copy using the external encoder
foobar2000 (with external encoder)
JetAudio
Media Go
MediaMonkey
MusicBee
Winamp
Yahoo! Music Jukebox

Unix-like operating systems
Asunder
Banshee
Cdparanoia
Mencoder
Grip
GNOME
Sound Juicer
KDE
K3b
Konqueror

OS packaged software

Apple

iOS 
FLAC is natively supported on IOS 11, including all "iDevices", but only via the Files (Apple) app or iCloud Drive. iTunes does not support FLAC, with Apple only offering native support for their own similar ALAC lossless audio format. Third-party applications are available in the App Store which enable FLAC playback.

Jailbroken iOS devices could play it through the applications from Cydia.

macOS 
As with their iOS operating system, Apple's iTunes software on macOS cannot natively playback FLAC audio files. One exception to this is with the use of a third-party software plug-in, which currently allows iTunes software to playback a small percentage of Ogg-based FLAC files. Computers that run on the MacOS High Sierra operating can play Flac files via QuickTime Player. Older versions require third-party non-iTunes media players in order to playback FLAC files, or to encode into FLAC files.

Android 
Native support for FLAC was added to the Android operating system starting from the 3.1 'Honeycomb' update. The feature came about after much public discussion on Android's Google Code development site. However, FLAC support is limited to .FLAC files as Android does not support decode inside of other file containers (such as MP4 and MKV).

Prior to the Android 3.1 update, Samsung included native support on over 32 Android devices, including their Galaxy line of phones. In addition, other prior Android device users could only (and still today) resort to using third-party applications (apps) available for Android such as PowerAMP, andLess, Astro Player or otherwise alternatively turn to installing custom system ROMs such as CyanogenMod. Note that some of these third-party applications, especially PowerAMP, decode FLAC and other formats using FFmpeg and therefore do not rely on the operating system to provide that functionality.

Microsoft 
The Windows Mobile operating system is able to support playback of FLAC files through the use of plugins or third-party applications such as TCMP and others. On Windows Phone 7 (WP7) there is no FLAC support available in the default Zune media player though playback is supported in third-party applications like a Flac Player. Similar goes for Windows Phone 8.

Microsoft Windows 10 supports FLAC decoding in Windows Media Player and other software that uses Windows platform APIs for audio decoding.

After-market / FLAC support with modding 
Nintendo Wii when running the Wii homebrew app MPlayerWii or MPlayer CE or WiiMC
Apple TV, Plex, XBMC Media Center or Boxee
iPod: 1st through Classic generation, iPod mini and 1st/2nd generation iPod nano (not the shuffle, 3rd gen nano, or touch), using third party Rockbox firmware
Nearly all other Rockbox-compatible DAPs, including the iriver and Gigabeat (Toshiba) range of devices, plus the aforementioned iPods
Sound Devices 7-Series Professional Audio Recorders with "badger" firmware update (v.2.24)
Sony PlayStation Portable when running the homebrew LightMP3 application.
Samsung YP-P3, YP-Q1, YP-Q2, YP-U5, YP-S5 (with upgraded firmware available from Samsung website)
FLAC playback is possible on mobile devices or phones based on Windows Mobile, or Symbian OS with either S60, Series 80 or Series 90 UI platforms, can run the free open source media player application OggPlay. Also LCG Jukebox from Lonely Cat Games is able to play FLAC audio on Symbian S60 and Windows Mobile devices.
Android operating system devices are capable of playing FLAC since version 3.1 Others may also support it by replacing the device's firmware with the third-party CyanogenMod ROM, which can play back FLAC. Otherwise users could simply opt to use a third-party supported application for Android such as PowerAMP, andLess, RockPlayer or Meridian Media Player. Such players can even recognize the tags after using Extended Media Scanner. Example of this include HTC HD2 running third-party Android software.
 Rockbox open source firmware for multiple portable audio players

References

External links 
 GSMArena Phone Finder: all phones & tablets with FLAC support
 FLAC links page: another (non-exhaustive) list of products with FLAC support
 2l.no/hire : free download FLAC, DSD, DSF for test purposes.

Computer-related introductions in 2001
Cross-platform software
Free audio software
Free multimedia codecs, containers, and splitters
Lossless audio codecs
Xiph.Org projects
Free codecs
Free software lists and comparisons